Asghar Sharafi (born 22 December 1942) is an Iranian football coach and former player who was head coach of Mes Sarcheshmeh. He has coached many teams such as Esteghlal, Iranjavan, Bargh Shiraz, Pegah and Ekbatan. He is one of the oldest head coaches in Iranian football history.

Playing career
Sharafi has one brother and one sister. He began his football career at Shahin and then joined the Taj. In 1964 he moved to PAS Tehran and was a teammate of Mohammad Ranjbar, Hassan Habibi and Mahmoud Yavari. Between 1967 and 1973 he was a member of the national team and won the 1968 and 1972 AFC Asian Cups. He played one match at the 1970 Asian Games and 1972 Summer Olympics each and scored one goal in 1970.

References

External links

 rsssf.com

1942 births
Living people
Sportspeople from Tehran
Iranian footballers
Iranian football managers
Iranian expatriate football managers
Shahin FC players
Esteghlal F.C. players
Pas players
Esteghlal F.C. managers
Olympic footballers of Iran
1968 AFC Asian Cup players
1972 AFC Asian Cup players
Footballers at the 1972 Summer Olympics
Iran international footballers
Footballers at the 1970 Asian Games
Association football forwards
Asian Games competitors for Iran
FC DAC 1904 Dunajská Streda managers
Iranian expatriate sportspeople in Slovakia
Expatriate football managers in Slovakia
Bargh Shiraz F.C. managers